The alpine meadow-skink or alpine water skink (Eulamprus kosciuskoi)  is a species of skink found in New South Wales, Queensland, and Victoria in Australia.

References

Eulamprus
Reptiles described in 1932
Taxa named by James Roy Kinghorn